Illupaividuthy is a village in the Orathanadu taluk of Thanjavur district, Tamil Nadu, India.

Demographics 

As per the 2001 census, Illupaividuthy had a total population of 1189 with 600 males and 589 females. The sex ratio was 982. The literacy rate was 43.37.

References 

 

Villages in Thanjavur district